Johannes Meyer (born 19 February 1981 in Bloefanter) is a Namibian rugby union prop. He is a member of the Namibia national rugby union team and participated with the squad at the 2007 Rugby World Cup.

References

1981 births
Living people
Rugby union props
Namibian rugby union players
Namibia international rugby union players